The Republic of Lebanon Ministry of Education & Higher Education is a government agency of Lebanon. Its headquarters are in Beirut.

List of ministers 
As of 2022, there have been thirteen people who have served as minister of education.

See also

References

External links
 Ministry of Education & Higher Education website
 General Directorate of Higher Education website 
 Center for Educational Research and Development
 Lebanese University
 List of universities in Lebanon
 Ministry of Information (Lebanon)

Lebanon
Education and Higher Education
Education ministers of Lebanon